Love Too Much may refer to:

 "Love Too Much", a 2014 song by Hunter Hayes from Storyline
 "Love Too Much", a 2019 song by Keane from Cause and Effect